WITL-FM (100.7 MHz) is a radio station broadcasting a country music format. Licensed to Lansing, Michigan, and serving Ingham, Eaton and Clinton Counties in Michigan.  It first began broadcasting in 1961 (as WMRT-FM) alongside daytime only station WMRT(AM).  The stations were purchased by Mid-West Family for $187,000 in 1964 and took the WITL and WITL-FM call sign in 1966, and adopted a full-time country music format in 1967.  Originally, WITL-FM was simulcast with (now defunct) WITL (AM) at 1010 kHz. The AM station went silent in 1997.  It is currently owned and operated by Townsquare Media.  Notable station alumni include author and former ABC News correspondent Tim O'Brien and progressive talk show host Thom Hartmann.

On August 30, 2013, a deal was announced in which Townsquare would acquire 53 Cumulus Media stations, including WITL-FM, for $238 million. The deal was part of Cumulus' acquisition of Dial Global; Townsquare and Dial Global were both controlled by Oaktree Capital Management. The transaction was consummated effective November 14, 2013.

After moving to new studios and offices shared with co-owned stations, the original 'white house' studios and offices were torn down in 2017.

WITL-FM is licensed for HD Radio operations. Its HD2 feed features the Olivet Nazarene University-owned "Shine.FM" Contemporary Christian music format originating at WONU in Kankakee, Illinois with local imaging, feeding ONU-owned analog translator W237BY 95.3 FM licensed to Mason with transmitter in downtown Lansing. Its HD3 signal airs Christian music from Air1.

References

Michiguide.com - WITL-FM History

External links

Country radio stations in the United States
ITL-FM
Townsquare Media radio stations
Radio stations established in 1965